Mauritian Creoles are the people on the island of Mauritius and in the wider overseas Mauritian diaspora who trace their roots to Black Africans who were brought to Mauritius under slavery from the seventeenth to the nineteenth century.  It can also refer to and include members of the island's mixed race or Métis community, especially if they are Christian. In government records, creoles along with Franco-Mauritians form part of the broader group known as Population Générale.

Nowadays, a significant proportion of Mauritian Creoles have African ancestry with varying amounts of French and Indian ancestry. Rodriguais, Agaléans and Chagossians are usually incorporated within this ethnic group.

Mauritian Creoles along with their Rodriguais, Agaléan and Chagossian counterparts make up 28% of the Mauritian population living in the Republic of Mauritius. There is also significant representation of Mauritian Creoles within the overseas Mauritian Disapora. 

Mauritian Creoles have made a significant contribution to the development of Mauritian culture including the development of the islands iconic sega dance and music genre.

French based, Mauritian Creole is also the most commonly used local language in Mauritius and is unique to the island, having evolved from its use in the creole community of Mauritius at the time of slavery and prior to the arrival of indentured labourers from India.

Origins
The African ancestors of this community were captured by slave traders and brought in to work in the plantations of Mauritius, Agaléga, Rodrigues and the Chagos Islands. They were Bantus mostly brought from East Africa (notably Mozambique) and Madagascar. The Creole population also encompasses those who are a product of the admixture of african and non-african communities and who retained or adopted Christianity. Genetic analysis has confirmed significant South East Asian ancestry via the Malagasy roots

See also
 Dougla people
 Coloureds
 Mulatto
 Mauritian Creole
 Mauritian of Chinese origin
 Franco Mauritians
 Mauritians of Indian origin

References

Ethnic groups in Mauritius
People of African descent